"PALAZZO" is a song by a Nigerian disc jockey SPINALL, featuring Asake. It was released on 13 May 2022, through TheCAP Music. SPINALL, and Asake wrote the song, produced by SPINALL and Magix Sticks, with sound engineer Eskeez. PALAZZO earned SPINALL his third UK Afrobeats Singles Chart entry at number 6, and earned Asake third entry on the chart. It also earned SPINALL his first entry on the Billboard U.S. Afrobeats Songs at number 6, and earned Asake, his third entry on the chart. The song was ranked at number 1 on TheCable's list of 10 TCL radio pick of the week, and debuted on number 2 on the TurnTable Top 50 chart.

In a review for BellaNaija, the author wrote, "PALAZZO" is a certified Party Starter.

Background
Magix Sticks served as the producer of "PALAZZO", with SPINALL, who served as the co-producer. The song features Asake, credited as a featured artist, and songwriter, with guest Olamide, who served as a co-writer of "PALAZZO", and oversees the music production, with SPINALL. "PALAZZO" was released on 13 May 2022, as the lead single off SPINALL next studio album.

On 13 May 2022, he released the official music video to "PALAZZO", shot and directed by TG Omori.

Commercial performance
During its debut week, on 13 May 2022, "PALAZZO" peaked at number 86 on Apple Music Top 100 Global Songs Chart. "PALAZZO" also debut at number 4 in Nigeria, 37 in Dominica, 44 in Ghana, 46 in Gambia, 61 in Ireland, 70 in Niger, 76 in UAE, and 77 in Kenya, on Apple Music. On 22 May 2022, it debuted at number 6 on the UK Afrobeats Singles chart, and reached number 4. On 23 May 2022, it debuted at number 2 on the Nigeria TurnTable Top 50 chart. On 25 May 2022, it debuted at number 6 on the Billboard U.S. Afrobeats Songs chart, number 3 on TurnTable Top 50 Streaming Songs chart, and number 8 on TurnTable Top 50 Airplay.

Credits and personnel
SPINALL – primary artist, songwriting, production
Asake – lead vocals, songwriting
Olamide - songwriting
Magix Sticks – production
Eskeez – mixing, mastering

Charts

Release history

References 

2022 songs
2022 singles
Nigerian afropop songs